Sinclair Knight Merz (SKM) was a private Australian company operating across Asia Pacific, the Americas, Europe, the Middle East and Africa. The company had global capability in strategic consulting, engineering and project delivery.

Jacobs Engineering Group announced its acquisition of SKM late in 2013 for AUS$1.3 billion (approximately US$1.2 billion as of the date of purchase)

Overview 
The firm had approximately 7,500 staff working in 47 offices around the world. This workforce represents a range of disciplines including engineers, planners, architects, economists, scientists, project managers, technicians and administrative staff. The business was wholly owned by approximately 500 staff members in a partnership arrangement.

In the fiscal year 2011–12 the firm's financial revenue was AUS$1.43 billion.

SKM's operations are divided into four broad "Business Units":
 Buildings & Infrastructure
 Mining & Metals
 Power & Energy
 Water & Environment
Various technical disciplines sit within these broad categories. For example, specialist rail and tunneling staff are based in the Infrastructure Business Unit.

An umbrella "Group" division contains teams responsible for specific project delivery skills, such as risk management, safety and economic planning.

History 
The Sinclair & Knight practice was established in Sydney Australia in 1964 by Bruce Sinclair and Jack Knight. The firm grew rapidly over the next 30 years, and in 1996 it merged with Merz Australia (A firm descended from the Merz & McLellan business begun by Charles Merz) to form Sinclair Knight Merz. A series of mergers over the following ten years saw the firm's continued expansion in size, geography and services.

Controversies 
SKM faced criminal charges between 2006 and 2011 for suspected bribing of officials in Vietnam, and between 2000 and mid-2005 in the Philippines. The AFP launched its SKM complaint in July 2013 but the company was not put to trial until June 2018

Major projects
El Teniente, Chile (engineering and design)
Hume Highway, Australia (road, bridge, drainage design and environmental management)
Irrigation Modernisation Project, Victoria, Australia (engineering design and program management))
The Eden Project (structural and civil design)
Athens Olympic Stadium (structural design)
Wembley Stadium redevelopment (seating and roof design)
Gold Coast desalination plant (engineering and design)
Port upgrade, Dampier Western Australia (engineering, procurement and construction management)
The Roundhouse (London) (structural engineering and roof design)
Project Seabird – Indian naval base (planning, design, civil and construction supervision services)
Dublin Light Rail system (track, civil, structural and building design)
Australian Air Warfare Destroyer program (detail design, marine engineering, risk management, infrastructure engineering)
Albury-Wodonga Hume Freeway bypass (design)
Central Motorway Junction, Auckland, New Zealand (strategic planning and project delivery)

References

2011–12 SKM Annual Review

External links
Sinclair Knight Merz

Construction and civil engineering companies of Australia
Engineering consulting firms of Australia
Security consulting firms
Defunct companies of Australia
Consulting firms established in 1964
Construction and civil engineering companies established in 1964
Australian companies established in 1964